Sunday All Stars is a Philippine television variety show broadcast by GMA Network. It premiered on June 16, 2013 on the network's Sunday Grande sa Hapon line up replacing Party Pilipinas. The show concluded on August 2, 2015 with a total of 107 episodes. It was replaced by Sunday PinaSaya in its timeslot.

Overview

History
Sunday All Stars replaced Party Pilipinas, which was put off-air by the network management due to issues involving its production teams.

The show held its pilot episode on June 16, 2013 with the cast members forming four celebrity teams:  Tropang Trending, Ligang iLike, InstaGang and Tweet Hearts.  Each team had celebrity leaders rotating each month. The judges will then access their performances determining who gave the best production per week. Criteria for judging includes conceptualization, execution and entertainment value. Home viewers are given a chance to choose who their best team is via online and SMS voting. Voting starts from 12:00 PM of Monday up to the shows airing on Sundays at 1:45 PM. The remaining points will come from the show's segment "Kalerki-Oke" which is done live.[5]

The combined scores are divided into the following: 65% comes from the judges, 20% comes from the SMS votes, 10% comes from the online votes, and the remaining 5% comes from the "Kalerki-Oke" segment. The winner of the week's show will have the privilege to open the show on next week's episode.

The show had one of the most talked about episode wherein a guy did his wedding proposal to his girlfriend live on stage towards the end of Tropang Trending's performance.

In July 2013, main host Ogie Alcasid left the show as his contract with GMA Network expired on June 30, 2013 and subsequently, in August 2013 Alcasid transferred to TV5.  Various Kapuso artists took over his place in the show as guests judges while Jolina Magdangal came back to the show as one of the hosts. In August 2013, Kyla joined the show as part of Team Insta Gang and Rodjun Cruz also became a show regular. In 2014, Jolina Magdangal left GMA to return to ABS-CBN after twelve years including singers Jay-R and Kyla, which didn't renew their GMA contracts and moved to ABS-CBN. Actress Empress Schuck left ABS-CBN after eight years, and returned to GMA and is a new addition to Sunday All Stars. Another main host, Janno Gibbs, left GMA after being a Kapuso artist for over three decades, moving to TV5 to join his colleague and former SAS main host Ogie Alcasid.

In April 2014, the management decide to reformat the program from the usual competition to a straight-up musical variety show as a homage to their timeslot predecessors, SOP and Party Pilipinas. It also reduced its broadcast time to at least 90 minutes.

Cancellation
On August 2, 2015, after more than three decades of broadcasting musical variety shows on its Sunday noontime block, the network has decided to change trends. GMA Network entered into co-production with APT Entertainment, a subsidiary of TAPE, Inc., to broadcast the comedy variety show  Sunday PinaSaya which is hosted by Marian Rivera, Ai-Ai Delas Alas, Jose Manalo and Wally Bayola, among others. It occupied the 12nn to 2:30pm timeslot and is followed by another (then) blocktimed show Wowowin, which is produced by WBR Entertainment Productions, Inc. owned by game show host himself, Willie Revillame.

Cast

 Janno Gibbs 
 Regine Velasquez-Alcasid
 Ogie Alcasid 
 Jaya

Co-hosts and performers

Featuring
Addlib
Philippine Island Assassin
SexBomb Girls
Junior New System

Teams

Insta Gang
Team color: Blue
Former team leaders
 Christian Bautista 
 Glaiza de Castro 
 WinWyn Marquez 
 Mark Herras 
 LJ Reyes 
 Kris Lawrence 
 Aljur Abrenica 
 Rochelle Pangilinan 
 Kyla 
 Mark Bautista 
 LJ Reyes 
 Kyla

Ligang iLike
Team color: Yellow

Former team leaders
 Jolina Magdangal 
 Kris Bernal 
 Louise delos Reyes 
 Aljur Abrenica 
 Kyla 
 Aicelle Santos 
 Mark Bautista 
 Alden Richards 
 Winwyn Marquez 
 Andrea Torres 
 Sef Cadayona 
 Derrick Monasterio 
 Kris Bernal

Tropang Trending
Team color: Green

Former team leaders
 Mark Bautista 
 Mark Herras 
 Rochelle Pangilinan 
 Rachelle Ann Go 
 Jay R 
 Max Collins 
 Rocco Nacino 
 Rodjun Cruz 
 Max Collins 
 Frencheska Farr 
 Yassi Pressman 
 Kris Lawrence 
 Mark Bautista

Tweet Hearts
Team color: Red

Former team leaders
 Jennylyn Mercado 
 Julie Anne San Jose 
 Sef Cadayona 
 Alden Richards 
 Rodjun Cruz 
 Mark Herras 
 Jay R 
 Louise delos Reyes 
 Kris Bernal 
 Rochelle Pangilinan 
 Christian Bautista 
 Rocco Nacino

Results
Team colors

Cycle 1

Notes

  Jolina Magdangal passed the role to Kris Bernal as the leader of Ligang iLike due to her doctor's health advice. Bernal will be the substitute leader of the team for two weeks and until Magdangal's recovery.

Cycle 2

Cycle 3

Cycle 4

Cycle 5

Standout Awards
Winners are listed first and highlighted in bold.

Season 1

Season 2
Standout performer - Mark Bautista 
Standout team - Tweet Hearts

Season 3
Standout performer -Christian Bautista 
Standout team - Insta Gang

Season 4
Standout performer -Rita de Guzman 
Standout team - Insta Gang

Season 5
Standout performer -Kris Lawrence  
Standout team - Ligang iLike

Guests
 Marian Rivera - promoting My Lady Boss
 Angelika dela Cruz, Sunshine Dizon, Lauren Young, Gabby Eigenmann - promoting the premiere week of Mundo Mo'y Akin
 Dennis Trillo, Tom Rodriguez - promoting the premiere week of My Husband's Lover
 Joyce Ching, Krystal Reyes, Yasmien Kurdi - promoting the finale week of Anna KareNina
 Lucho Ayala - promoting the premiere week of Kahit Nasaan Ka Man
 Raymart Santiago, Roxanne Guinoo, Jillian Ward - promoting the premiere week of Home Sweet Home
 Lee Jung-jin - promoting the Instant Mommy
 Isabel Oli, Katrina Halili, Alessandra De Rossi, Sid Lucero, Dominic Roco - promoting the premiere week of Magkano Ba ang Pag-ibig?
 Bianca King, Rafael Rosell, Dion Ignacio - promoting the premiere week of Maghihintay Pa Rin
 Shane Filan - former lead vocalist of Westlife promoting his single "Everything to Me"
 Hideaki Torio, Arkin del Rosario - German Moreno birthday tribute performance
 Rhian Ramos, TJ Trinidad, Lauren Young, Lorna Tolentino - promoting the premiere week of Genesis
 LJ Reyes, Renz Fernandez - promoting the premiere week of Prinsesa ng Buhay Ko
 Megan Young, Lauren Young - interview about Young's Miss World 2013 victory
 Dennis Trillo, Tom Rodriguez - promoting their album TomDen
 Renz Valerio, Bianca Umali, Hershey Garcia, Miko, Zarsadias - promoting the finale week of Mga Basang Sisiw
 Tim Yap - promoting the season 3 premiere of The Tim Yap Show
 Chynna Ortaleza, Benjamin Alves, Geoff Eigenmann, Mikael Daez - promoting Adarna
 Regine Velasquez-Alcasid - promoting her latest album Hulog Ka Ng Langit
 Elmo Magalona - promoting Villa Quintana
 Joyce Ching, Phytos Ramirez - promoting Paraiso Ko'y Ikaw
 Yasmien Kurdi - promoting the premiere week of Rhodora X
 Marian Rivera, Agot Isidro, Raymond Bagatsing, Jennica Garcia, Roi Vinzon, RJ Padilla, Krystal Reyes - promoting the premiere week of Carmela
 Luis Alandy, Gwen Zamora and Jackie Rice - promoting the premiere week of Innamorata 	
 Mike Tan - promoting the premiere week of Kambal Sirena

Judges
 Joey De Leon
 Pops Fernandez
 Kuh Ledesma
 Jaclyn Jose
 Marian Rivera
 German Moreno
 Lorna Tolentino
 Tom Rodriguez
 Dingdong Dantes
 Jose Manalo
 Maricel Soriano

Performers

Ratings
According to AGB Nielsen Philippines' Mega Manila household television ratings, the pilot episode of Sunday All Stars earned a 13.3% rating. While the final episode scored a 13.7% rating.

Accolades

References

External links
 

2013 Philippine television series debuts
2015 Philippine television series endings
Filipino-language television shows
GMA Network original programming
Philippine variety television shows